The River Bourne or the Chertsey Bourne is in Berkshire and Surrey; it runs from sources in Windsor Great Park and Swinley Forest through to the River Thames.

Course

Upstream of Virginia Water (village)
After gathering a number of streams flowing from north, south and west into Virginia Water Lake the stream coalesces into one large stream for the rest of its course.  The lake is largely created by a steep boulder cascade with eastern embankments close to car parks at the side of Windsor Great Park, on the A30 London Road.  The Chertsey Bourne flows through the north of the landscaped Wentworth Estate, a residential 'golfside' mansions estate dating to periods since the 1920s, where a further weir creates the much smaller Wentworth Pond which is by the Wentworth Club clubhouse.  Before Wellington Bridge across the course, the Wentworth Brook rising in Sunningdale Golf Club joins. After this the brook is less exposed to view forming a wide, wooded divide in Virginia Water lined with a walk.

The land either side of the River Bourne below the Lake and west of Virginia Water railway station is owned by Runnymede Borough Council as trustees of the Cabrera Trust, named after Spanish noble Ramòn Cabrera who owned and developed a wide landscape at Wentworth.

Early Bridges
The bridge nearest the source is an old girder bridge. It is a curiosity and its origin is obscure. Old maps show the valley as wet pastureland, probably suitable for cattle, so a strong bridge would have been necessary.

Near the second bridge downstream from the source, there is a colony of mandarin ducks. They were introduced to the River Bourne in 1929–30. The colony is probably the largest in the United Kingdom and is of international significance due to the rapid decline of mandarin ducks in its native Asia.

Downstream of Virginia Water (village)
At Thorpe Green, a green, road and line of houses beneath Virginia Water station, the river forms the southern border of Thorpe and the northern border of Lyne. During its passage, the northern bank of the River Bourne receives more sun than the south. This affects the microclimate as there are seasonal frost pockets and areas of high humidity which impacts on the vegetation. The Bourne passes into Chertsey and adjoins Chertsey Meads before entering the grounds of St George's College, formerly Woburn Park, close to the Thames in Addlestone. Here, now slow-flowing, as a small river, it joins with the Addlestone branch. Combined, these briefly create a back-gardens feature with a deep, vertical metal-lined channel.

The longest tract of public land is upstream at and by Virginia Water Lake, particularly beyond that when Windsor Great Park is open, in this section it include walks in two parks in Chertsey.  The river creates access for small motorboats and canoes for the  20 properties in its lowest reach at Hamm Court. Only the lower section below a weir is canalised, the remainder is natural bank, forming a minor habitat for the European water vole. The middle course of the Bourne passes under the M3 motorway three times in a short space. In the midst of which the M25 also crosses it.

Surrounding Soil, Elevations and Rainfall
It is a small river, once past Virginia Water lake about 3–5 m wide and flows over land which is geologically between the Bagshot and London Formations, where sands and gravel overlie chalk with limited clay, described as "loamy soils with naturally high groundwater".   Soils are generally around the upper reaches acid heath followed in the lower reaches by alluvium (flood plain deposits).

Below Thorpe the Bourne is one of several Thames tributaries and the wider plain of surrounding land is lower lying.  Elevations range as follows:

Local annual rainfall is about 635 mm.

Flood Risk
In January 2003, the River Bourne burst its banks in Chertsey. Approximately 130 properties were flooded and public buildings, including St Anne's County Primary School, were cut off by floodwater. Local concerns that this flood was exacerbated by the building of the Jubilee River are false as this scheme protects the Windsor and Maidenhead area, however, the Environment Agency is introducing plans for a new flood alleviation scheme which will create additional capacity to help other affected reaches of the Thames, at Staines upon Thames and Chertsey.

Fishing
The river is fished. The chub can reach 2 kg, with barbel reported to touch 3 kg. Bream to 1 kg or even carp to 5 kg are reported, along with roach, dace, perch, and pike. The stretch of water running past and through Chertsey Meads is particularly full of fish when the River Thames is in spate due to heavy rainfall because the fish swim up the River Bourne to escape the turbulence.

See also
Tributaries of the River Thames
List of rivers of England

Notes and references
Notes 
  
References

Bourne
Bourne
1Bourne